The men's 5000 metres in speed skating at the 1972 Winter Olympics took place on 4 February, at the Makomanai Open Stadium.

Records
Prior to this competition, the existing world and Olympic records were as follows:

Results

References

Men's speed skating at the 1972 Winter Olympics